Jalen Marquis McDaniels (born January 31, 1998) is an American professional basketball player for the Philadelphia 76ers of the National Basketball Association (NBA). He played college basketball for the San Diego State Aztecs.

High school career
A native of Federal Way, Washington, McDaniels attended Federal Way High School, where he also played football. McDaniels was the ranked as the 98th best prospect in the class of 2016 heading into his senior season at Federal Way High School. He was named an Associated Press Washington state Class 4A first-team selection after averaging 19 points, 10 rebounds and four blocked shots in his senior season. Federal Way finished the season undefeated with a record of 29-0 and won the Class 4A state championship.

College career
McDaniels red-shirted the 2016-2017 season. On February 19, 2018, he was named the Mountain West player of the week. In his freshman season he averaged 10.5 points in 24.7 minutes per game, starting 21 out of 33 games. In March 2018, McDaniels submitted paperwork for early entry into the 2018 NBA draft but had yet to hire an agent. In May, he worked out for the Cleveland Cavaliers.  On May 30, McDaniels officially withdrew his name from the NBA draft and returned to SDSU less than 90 minutes before the deadline.

As a sophomore, McDaniels averaged 15.9 points per game and led the team in rebounding with 8.3 rebounds per game. In March 2019, he declared for the 2019 NBA Draft. McDaniels was one of 66 players invited to the NBA Draft Combine.

Professional career

Charlotte Hornets (2019–2023)
McDaniels was selected with 52nd overall draft pick by the Charlotte Hornets. On October 10, 2019, he signed with the Hornets. On October 19, the contract between McDaniels and the Hornets was converted to a two-way contract, and the next day, he signed a multi-year contract with the Hornets. On October 25, 2019, McDaniels made his NBA debut, coming off the bench in a 99–121 loss to the Minnesota Timberwolves with two points and a rebound. He was assigned to the Hornets’ NBA G League affiliate, the Greensboro Swarm, for the start of the G League season. On March 9, 2020, McDaniels scored a season-high 11 points, alongside four rebounds, in a 138–143 double overtime loss to the Atlanta Hawks.

On April 7, 2021, McDaniels recorded a season-high 21 points, alongside six rebounds, three assists and two steals, in a 113–102 win over the Oklahoma City Thunder.

On October 27, 2021, McDaniels scored a season-high 16 points, alongside four rebounds, three assists and two steals, in a 120–111 win over the Orlando Magic. On December 27, he again scored 16 points, alongside three rebounds and three assists, in a 123–99 win over the Houston Rockets.

On January 16, 2023, McDaniels scored a career-high 26 points, alongside three rebounds and two steals, in a 118–130 loss to the Boston Celtics.

Philadelphia 76ers (2023–present) 
On February 9, 2023, McDaniels was traded to the Philadelphia 76ers in a four-team trade involving the Portland Trail Blazers and New York Knicks. On February 11, McDaniels made his 76ers debut, putting up five points and five rebounds in a 101–98 win over the Brooklyn Nets.

Career statistics

NBA

Regular season

|-
| style="text-align:left;"|
| style="text-align:left;"|Charlotte
| 16 || 0 || 18.3 || .471 || .375 || .824 || 4.1 || .8 || .5 || .2 ||5.6
|-
| style="text-align:left;"|
| style="text-align:left;"|Charlotte
| 47 || 18 || 19.2 || .468 || .333 || .703 || 3.6 || 1.1 || .6 || .4 || 7.4
|-
| style="text-align:left;"|
| style="text-align:left;"|Charlotte
| 55 || 2 || 16.3 || .484 || .380 || .736 || 3.1 || 1.1 || .5 || .4 || 6.2
|-
| style="text-align:left;"|
| style="text-align:left;"|Charlotte
| 56 || 21 || 26.7 || .447 || .322 || .846 || 4.8 || 2.0 || 1.2 || .5 || 10.6
|- class="sortbottom"
| style="text-align:center;" colspan="2"|Career
| 174 || 41 || 20.6 || .463 || .342 || .778 || 3.9 || 1.4 || .7 || .4 || 7.9

College

|-
| style="text-align:left;"| 2017–18
| style="text-align:left;"| San Diego State
| 33 || 21 || 24.7 || .586 || .211 || .788 || 7.5 || .9 || .8 || .6 || 10.5
|-
| style="text-align:left;"| 2018–19
| style="text-align:left;"| San Diego State
| 34 || 34 || 31.0 || .466 || .320 || .732 || 8.3 || 2.1 || 1.1 || .5 || 15.9
|- class="sortbottom"
| style="text-align:center;" colspan="2"| Career
| 67 || 55 || 27.9 || .504 || .298 || .758 || 7.9 || 1.5 || 1.0 || .5 || 13.2

Personal life
McDaniels's brother, Jaden McDaniels, is a professional basketball player for the Minnesota Timberwolves. He was the number one prospect in the state of Washington, the 6th best prospect in the nation, and a McDonald's All-American. Jaden played one season for Washington before turning professional. McDaniels is the cousin of former NBA player Juwan Howard.

References

External links
San Diego State Aztecs bio
NBA Draft Profile

1998 births
Living people
African-American basketball players
American men's basketball players
Basketball players from Washington (state)
Centers (basketball)
Charlotte Hornets draft picks
Charlotte Hornets players
Greensboro Swarm players
People from Federal Way, Washington
Power forwards (basketball)
San Diego State Aztecs men's basketball players
Sportspeople from King County, Washington
21st-century African-American sportspeople